

School of Information Technology (SIT)
School of Information Technology faculty is a small building near the library at King Mongkut's University of Technology Thonburi (KMUTT) in Bangmod, Bangkok Thailand that is the number one University of Thailand. The famous short name of the faculty is "SIT". Courses range from undergraduate to PHD. The bachelor's degree is separated into information technology and computer science (English program).

History
August 1995           First Bachelor of Science in Information Technology degree offered.
April–June 2000 First Computer science courses (in English program) bachelor's degree and master's degree offered. Then Information Technology course Master and Doctor Degree offered.
May 2002 E-Learning project opened to provide students the opportunity to a review lessons by DVD and CD. Then students can prepare or repeat the lesson by classroom on demand on the internet.
June 2004 courses Software Engineering in master's degree.

Life at School of Information Technology
SIT students study in two locations at KMUTT, and they are classroom building 2 on third floor and the SIT building. In the classroom building 2, it separated into 7 classrooms and 2 common rooms have computers, and in the SIT building there are 5 training rooms and 3 labs for relaxation or working. On the second floor there is private SIT library for borrowing technical books. Most classes have a teacher assistant to help student with lessons. All lecturers are dedicated to teaching, for instance, some lecturers increase lab time every week. Younger students respect the older students who mentor and assist them, and this also creates a good relationship.

References

University departments in Thailand